The Overwaitea Food Group is an operator of supermarkets, based in Langley, British Columbia. It is owned by the Jim Pattison Group. Most stores are under the Save-On-Foods banner, which it launched in 1982.

On March 8, 1915, Robert C. Kidd purchased a store at 746 Columbia Street in New Westminster, British Columbia. He developed several innovative merchandising techniques to attract customers to his store including odd-penny pricing and selling 18 ounces of tea for the price of a pound. The store was soon known as the "over-weight tea" store. When Kidd opened his second store, he decided to call it "Overwaitea".

As of August 2015, the Overwaitea Food Group owned and operated 145 grocery stores in B.C. and Alberta under six different brand names. OFG later opened four stores in Saskatchewan and three stores in Winnipeg, Manitoba during 2016.  Additionally, in 2017 a full-size store was opened in Whitehorse, Yukon.

In February 2014, it was announced that Overwaitea would purchase 15 stores from Sobey's, three in Alberta and twelve in British Columbia. The stores purchased were under the Safeway, Thrifty Foods, and Sobey's banners and all will convert to become Save-On-Foods stores.
It was also announced that Overwaitea would convert 11 Pricesmart Foods locations to the Save-On-Foods brand.

OFG employed over 15,000 team members, as of August 2015.

On March 22, 2018, the Overwaitea Foods banner became defunct with the closure of the last two locations in British Columbia, which were reopened the following day as Save-On-Foods stores.

Store Banners
Save-On-Foods
Urban Fare
PriceSmart Foods
Bulkley Valley Wholesale
Buy-Low Foods

More Rewards
More Rewards is a coalition customer loyalty program run by Overwaitea Food Group. Points can be earned at OFG store banners, Petro Canada gas stations (although this agreement ended on July 31, 2020), Panago, Coast Hotels, Jim Pattison Auto Group locations, and more. The program also had a Visa credit card offered by Scotiabank, although it was discontinued on August 31, 2019.

References

External links
Official website

Jim Pattison Group
Supermarkets of Canada

Food and drink companies based in British Columbia